Anna Cabot Lowell (September 29, 1811 – January 7, 1874) was an American writer.

Biography
Anna Cabot Jackson was born in Boston, Massachusetts, in 1819. She married Charles Russell Lowell, Jr., son of Charles Russell Lowell, Sr. She was the mother of Civil War General Charles Russell Lowell and daughter Rose, who died at young age in the early 1850s. She died in Cambridge, Massachusetts, 7 January 1874.

Works
 Theory of Teaching (Boston, 1841)
 Edward's First Lessons in Grammar (1843)
 Gleanings from the Poets, for Home and School (1843)
 Edward's First Lessons in Geometry (1844)
 Olympic Games (1845)
 Outlines of Astronomy, or the World as it Appears (1850)
 Letters to Madame Pulksky, by an American Lady (1852)
 Thoughts on the Education of Girls (1853)
 Seed-Grain for Thought and Discussion (1856)
 Posies for Children, a Book of Verses (1870)

References

1811 births
1874 deaths
Writers from Boston
19th-century American women writers
19th-century American writers